Teenage Mutant Ninja Turtles IV can refer to:

TMNT (film), a Teenage Mutant Ninja Turtles film.
The Super NES version of the video game Teenage Mutant Ninja Turtles: Turtles in Time.

See also
 Teenage Mutant Ninja Turtles (disambiguation)

sv:Teenage Mutant Ninja Turtles IV